Between Two Worlds is a 2021 French drama film directed by Emmanuel Carrère, loosely based on Florence Aubenas's 2010 autobiographical book The Night Cleaner. The film stars Juliette Binoche. The film had its world premiere as the opening film of the Directors' Fortnight section at the 2021 Cannes Film Festival on 7 July 2021.

Premise
Parisian journalist Marianne Winckler goes undercover in the world of temporary and precarious work, applying to work a series of menial jobs including a position as a cleaning lady aboard a ferry service between Ouistreham and Portsmouth.

Cast

Release
Between Two Worlds was selected to be screened as the opening film in the Directors' Fortnight section at the 2021 Cannes Film Festival. It had its world premiere at Cannes on 7 July 2021. It was theatrically released by Memento Distribution in France on 12 January 2022.

Reception

Box office
Between Two Worlds grossed $0 in North America, and $3.1 million in France for a worldwide total of $3.8 million.

Critical response
On Rotten Tomatoes, the film holds an approval rating of 75% based on 20 reviews, with an average rating of 6.10/10. According to Metacritic, which assigned a weighted average score of 58 out of 100 based on 8 critics, the film received "mixed or average reviews".

Anna Smith of Deadline Hollywood wrote, "Between Two Worlds hits all the beats of an arthouse crowd pleaser for audiences who, like Marianne, can go back to their comfortable homes with a renewed appreciation for the people who clean up after them." Ben Kenigsberg of RogerEbert.com called it an "adequate muckraking drama that avoids the hectoring tone of certain recent Ken Loach films." Wendy Ide of Screen Daily wrote, "Certainly, this picture ticks plenty of social realist boxes. But there's a satisfying added depth born out of the persuasively fleshed out performances and the focus on female friendship." Also writing in The Observer, Ide specifically praised the "incendiary, scene-dominating turn from newcomer Hélène Lambert" for giving the film "its jagged, furious energy". Varietys Peter Debruge criticized the film's portrayal of cleaning women and wrote, "It's not clear whether watching Binoche scrub a few toilets is meant to dignify/humanize those stuck doing such chores, or to underscore the lengths to which she'll go as an actor. Filmmakers have been embedding themselves in "invisible" communities for years now — Nomadland director Chloé Zhao has been a pioneer of this approach — and Between Two Worlds feels behind the curve." In a 3-star review, Edward Porter of The Sunday Times lamented that "the script's balance is off: the journalist's ethical dilemmas become too big a part of the drama. The best scenes are those in which she gets to know some of her colleagues and hears their stories."

Awards and nominations

References

External links
 

2021 films
2020s French films
2020s French-language films
2021 drama films
Biographical films about journalists
French drama films
Films based on non-fiction books
Films set in Normandy
Films shot in Normandy
France 3 Cinéma films